Interlocutor may refer to:

 Interlocutor (music), the master of ceremonies of a minstrel show
 Interlocutor (politics), someone who informally explains the views of a government and also can relay messages back to a government
 Interlocutor (linguistics), a participant in a discourse
 Interlocutory, a type of legal order, sentence, decree, or judgment

See also
 Interlocutory appeal
 Interlocutory injunction